Lone Grove Township is one of twenty townships in Fayette County, Illinois, USA.  As of the 2010 census, its population was 656 and it contained 294 housing units.  This township was formed from LaClede and Wilberton townships in September 1876.

Geography

Cities, towns, villages
 St. Peter

Unincorporated towns
 Loogootee
 Saint Peter
(This list is based on USGS data and may include former settlements.)

Cemeteries
The township contains these four cemeteries: Ambuehl, Harris, New Saint Peter and Old Saint Peter.

Major highways
  Illinois Route 185

Demographics

School districts
 Brownstown Community Unit School District 201
 South Central Community Unit School District 401

Political districts
 Illinois' 19th congressional district
 State House District 102
 State Senate District 51

References
 
 United States Census Bureau 2007 TIGER/Line Shapefiles
 United States National Atlas

External links
 City-Data.com
 Illinois State Archives

Townships in Fayette County, Illinois
Populated places established in 1876
Townships in Illinois
1876 establishments in Illinois